The 2013–14 Oman Professional League (known as the Omantel Professional League for sponsorship reasons) is the 38th edition of the top football league in Oman. The Oman Football League got the seal of approval of a professional league on 1 September 2013 and will henceforth be called the Omantel Professional League (OPL). The season began on 13 September 2013, and concluded on 16 May 2014. Al-Suwaiq Club were the defending champions, having won their third title in the previous 2012–13 Elite League season. On Sunday, 28 April 2014, Al-Nahda Club were crowned the champions of the inaugural Oman Professional League with one game remaining after Al-Suwaiq Club edged out ten-man Fanja SC 5-3. Fanja SC needed a draw or a win on Sunday to prolong the fight for the OPL title, after Al-Nahda Club defeated Saham SC 4-3 to take their tally to 51 points, but its defeat dashed any hopes for the eight-time winners to match the record of nine titles, held by Dhofar S.C.S.C. in the 37-year-old history of Oman's top flight competition.

Teams
This season the league had 14 teams. Oman Club and Salalah SC were relegated to the First Division League after finishing in the relegation zone in the 2012–13 season. Al-Tali'aa SC were also relegated after losing the relegation/promotion playoff against Sohar SC. The three relegated teams were replaced by First Division League winners Al-Ittihad Club, runner-up Majees SC and second runner-up Sohar SC (Won the Relegation/Promotion playoff against Al-Tali'aa SC).

The winner and the runner-up will qualify for the 2015 AFC Cup

Stadia and locations

Managerial changes
Managerial changes during the 2013–14 campaign.

Foreign players
Restricting the number of foreign players strictly to four per team, including a slot for a player from AFC countries. A team could use four foreign players on the field during each game including at least one player from the AFC country.

League table

Results

Clubs season-progress

Promotion/relegation play-off

1st leg

2nd leg

''Al-Nasr secured promotion after winning 3-0 on aggregate

Season statistics

Top scorers

Top Omani Scorers

Hat-tricks

* Player scored 4 goals

OFA Awards
Oman Football Association awarded the following awards for the 2013–14 Oman Professional League season.
Top Scorer: Juma Saeed (Al-Nahda)
Best Player: Juma Saeed (Al-Nahda)
Best Goalkeeper: Faiz Al-Rushaidi (Al-Suwaiq)
Best Coach: Hamad Al-Azani (Al-Nahda)

Media coverage

Controversies
The league was the subject of controversies like the wearing of similar-coloured jerseys, unusual hairstyles and excessive goal celebrations.

On 20 September 2013, the match between Sur SC and Majees SC was called off by referee Fahad Al-Subahi on the premise that the teams were wearing similar-coloured jerseys'. But just three days later, the Oman Professional League's Disciplinary Committee decided to replay the match and ruled that Subahi had erred in his judgement. The match was replayed on 12 November 2013 which Sur SC won 2-1.

The Oman Football Association came out with a new code of conduct for players after a controversy in the aftermath of a football match between Fanja SC and Al-Nahda Club. According to the new regulations, OFA prohibits players from extreme celebrations on the field after scoring a goal and the governing body also bans players sporting unusual hairstyles or even colouring their hair. As a result, excessive goal celebrations and unusual hairstyles have been shown the red card by the OFA as it moves to protect the 'ethics' of the game. The decision came after Al-Nahda Club's Ivorian player Juma Saeed was seen 'inappropriately' celebrating on the field after scoring a goal against Fanja SC on 29 March 2014 that raised heated debates among the football aficionados in the country. However, the Ivory Coast player was reprimanded with a warning. OFA also decided to make the OPL's Disciplinary Committee an autonomous body with additional powers. Headed by the OFA board member Hamad Al-Hadrami, the Disciplinary Committee can now take action against players violating the new code of conduct. OFA also gave powers to the match referees who will now inspect the dressing room before any domestic games to ensure the players adhere to the code of conduct.

See also

2013–14 Sultan Qaboos Cup
2013–14 Oman Professional League Cup
2013–14 Oman Super Cup
2013–14 Oman First Division League
2013–14 Oman Second Division League

References

Top level Omani football league seasons
1
Oman